Vishwanath Pratap Singh  (25 June 1931 – 27 November 2008), shortened to V. P. Singh, was an Indian politician who was the 7th Prime Minister of India from 1989 to 1990 and the 41st Raja Bahadur of Manda. He is India's only prime minister to have been former royalty.

He was educated at the Allahabad University and Fergusson College in Pune.  In 1969, he joined the Indian National Congress party and was elected as a member of the Uttar Pradesh Legislative Assembly. In 1971, he became a Member of Parliament in the Lok Sabha. He served as the Minister of Commerce from 1976 to 1977.  In 1980, he became the Chief Minister of Uttar Pradesh and was known for the encounter of the gang of Phoolan Devi.

In the Rajiv Gandhi ministry, Singh was given various cabinet posts, including Minister of Finance and Minister of Defence. Singh was also the Leader of the Rajya Sabha from 1984 to 1987. During his tenure as Minister of Defence, the Bofors scandal came to light, and Singh resigned from the ministry. In 1988, he formed the Janata Dal party by merging various factions of the Janata Party. In the 1989 elections, the National Front, with the support of the Bharatiya Janata Party (BJP), formed the government and Singh became the 8th Prime Minister of India.

During his tenure as prime minister, he implemented the Mandal Commission report for India's backward castes, which led to major protests against the act. He also created the Sixty-second Amendment and enacted the Scheduled Caste and Scheduled Tribe Act in 1989. During his term the kidnapping of Rubaiya Sayeed happened and on the ground the terrorists were released. In 1990 the infamous exodus of Kashmiri Hindus happened from the valley of Kashmir. Following his opposition to the Ram Rath Yatra, the BJP withdrew its support for the National Front, and his government lost the vote of no-confidence. Singh resigned on 7 November 1990. His prime ministerial tenure lasted for 343 days.

Singh was the prime ministerial candidate for the National Front in the 1991 elections, but was defeated. He spoke out against the Babri Masjid demolition in 1992. After 1996, Singh retired from political posts, but continued to remain a public figure and political critic. He was diagnosed with multiple myeloma in 1998, and ceased public appearances until the cancer went into remission in 2003. However, he died from complications of multiple myeloma and kidney failure in 2008. He received full state honours.

Early life and education
Singh was born on 25 June 1931, the third child of the Hindu Rajput Zamindar family of Daiya, which is located on the banks of the Belan River in the Allahabad district. He was adopted by Raja Bahadur Ram Gopal Singh of Manda and became the heir-apparent. He became the Raja Bahadur of Manda at the age of 10 in 1941. His ancestors were rulers of the predecessor state of Manikpur was founded in 1180, by Raja Manik Chand, brother of Raja Jai Chand of Kannauj. His family belonged to the Gaharwar clan of the Manda Zamindar.

He obtained his education from Colonel Brown Cambridge School, Dehradun and got his Bachelor of Arts and Law degree from Allahabad University. He was the elected the vice president of Allahabad University Students Union and later received a Bachelor of Science in physics from Fergusson College in the Pune University.

Early political career 
Singh was elected from Soraon to the Uttar Pradesh Legislative Assembly in 1969 as a member of the Congress Party and became the chief whip for the legislative party. He got elected to the Lok Sabha in 1971 and was appointed a Deputy Minister of Commerce by Prime Minister Indira Gandhi in 1974. He served as the Minister of Commerce in 1976–77.

Chief Minister of Uttar Pradesh 
He was appointed as the Chief Minister of Uttar Pradesh in 1980, when Indira Gandhi was re-elected after the Janata interlude. As Chief Minister (1980–82), he cracked down hard on dacoity, a problem that was particularly severe in the rural districts of the southwest Uttar Pradesh. He received much favourable national publicity when he offered to resign following a self-professed failure to stamp out the problem, and again when he personally oversaw the surrender of some of the most feared dacoits of the area in 1983. The Behmai massacre provoked outrage across the country thereby causing V. P. Singh to resign in the wake of the killings. as he was the under whom Phoolan Devi surrendered as he saved her life by instructing the police officers to not kill her in the Police encounter to secure the votes of Dalits (though Phoolan's 22 gang members were killed). Singh was an upper caste man and had ruled the vote bank of upper-caste people in Uttar Pradesh for the Indian National Congress. He resumed his post as Minister of Commerce in 1983.

Leader of Rajya Sabha 
After he resigned from the position of Chief Minister of Uttar Pradesh, he was appointed as the leader of Rajya Sabha in the year 1984 and remained so until 1987. Before him the position was assigned to Pranab Mukherjee, who was removed because he then formed his own party, Rashtriya Samajwadi Congress. After Singh's tenure this position was given to N. D. Tiwari. He resigned from Rajya Sabha when he left Congress in 1987.

Member of Lok Sabha 
He was elected to Lok Sabha in 1971 from Phulpur (Lok Sabha constituency). He lost from Allahabad in 1977, but won in 1980 as member of Indira Congress. He resigned from Lok Sabha when he became Chief Minister of Uttar Pradesh in June 1980. After he resigned from Congress and quit as Rajya Sabha member in 1987, he entered Lok Sabha by winning the bye-poll for Allahabad seat vacated by Amitabh Bachchan. He was elected to Lok Sabha from Fatehpur (Lok Sabha constituency) in 1989 and became Prime Minister for 11 months. He was elected from Fatehpur again in 1991, the last time he contested any election.

Administerial skill 
He was considered very close to Rajiv Gandhi as well as Indira Gandhi and was loyal to them at a time when the experienced leaders of Congress Party founded a new party, Indian National Congress, and empowered the party of Indira Gandhi (Indian National Congress). Singh was known as "Mr. Clean" because of his impeccable history and also because of his opposition for the corruption in Bofors deal, which lead the way for him to contest his own party to fight the 1989 Lok Sabha Election and become Prime Minister of India. Singh was responsible for managing the coalition of the Left and the Bharatiya Janata Party (BJP) against Rajiv Gandhi to dethrone him in the 1989 elections. He is remembered for the important role that he played in 1989 that changed the course of Indian politics. Singh acted boldly by issuing an arrest warrant against L. K. Advani midway through the latter's Rath Yatra.

Ministries under Central Government
Singh has been on the list as one of the senior-most and most powerful leaders of the Indian National Congress and has held many important ministry positions such as Defence, External Affairs and Finance.

Minister of Finance (1984–1987) 
He was called to New Delhi following Rajiv Gandhi's mandate in the 1984 general election. Singh was appointed to the post of Finance Minister in the tenth Cabinet of India, where he oversaw the gradual relaxation of the License Raj (governmental regulation) as Gandhi had in mind. During his term as Finance Minister, he oversaw the reduction of gold smuggling by reducing gold taxes and giving the police a portion of the confiscated gold. He also gave extraordinary powers to the Enforcement Directorate of the Finance Ministry, the wing of the ministry charged with tracking down tax evaders, then headed by Bhure Lal. Singh's efforts to reduce government regulation of business and to prosecute tax fraud attracted widespread praise.

Following a number of high-profile raids on suspected evaders  including Dhirubhai Ambani and Amitabh Bachchan – Gandhi was forced to sack him as Finance Minister, possibly because many of the raids were conducted on industrialists who had supported the Congress financially in the past. However, Singh's popularity was at such a pitch that only a sideways move seemed to have been possible, to the Defence Ministry (in January 1987). Then he succeeded his position to Rajiv Gandhi.

Minister of Defence (1987) 
In the year 1987, Singh was appointed on the position of Defence Minister of India for the first time but only for a period less than 3 months from 24 January 1987 to 12 April 1987. He was at that time preceded to Rajiv Gandhi and succeeded in his position to Krishna Chandra Pant. At that time due to his non-corrupt image, he was also called 'Mr. Clean'. He was not able to do any good work for Defence due to holding the position for such a short time. But his biggest work was in the import of Bofors. Once ensconced in South Block, Singh began to investigate the notoriously murky world of defence procurement. After a while, word began to spread that Singh possessed information about the Bofors defence deal (the infamous arms-procurement fraud) that could damage Gandhi's reputation. Before he could act on it, he was dismissed from the Cabinet and, in response, resigned his memberships in the Congress Party (Indira) and the Lok Sabha. The deal of Bofors also played a very crucial role in making of his Prime Minister of India.

Minister of External Affairs (1989) 
He was appointed as the 16th Minister of External Affairs of India and remained in the position for another very short period of just 3 days from 2 December 1989 to 5 December 1989. He was succeeded by Inder Kumar Gujral for the position.

Formation of Janata Dal

Together with associates Arun Nehru and Arif Mohammad Khan, Singh floated an opposition party named Jan Morcha. He was re-elected to Lok Sabha in a tightly contested by-election from Allahabad, defeating Sunil Shastri. On 11 October 1988, the birthday of the original Janata coalition's leader Jayaprakash Narayan, Singh founded the Janata Dal by the merger of Jan Morcha, Janata Party, Lok Dal and Congress (S), in order to bring together all the centrist parties opposed to the Rajiv Gandhi government, and Singh was elected the President of the Janata Dal. An opposition coalition of the Janata Dal with regional parties including the Dravida Munnetra Kazhagam, Telugu Desam Party, and Asom Gana Parishad, came into being, called the National Front, with V. P. Singh as convener, NT Rama Rao as president, and P Upendra as a General Secretary.

The National Front fought 1989 General Elections after coming to an electoral understanding with Bharatiya Janata Party and the Left parties (the two main oppositions) that served to unify the anti-Congress vote. The National Front, with its allies, earned a simple majority in the Lok Sabha and decided to form a government. The Bharatiya Janta Party under the leadership of Atal Bihari Vajpayee and Lal Krishna Advani and the Left parties such as the Communist Party of India (Marxist) and the Communist Party of India declined to serve in the government, preferring to support the government from outside.

In a meeting in the Central Hall of Parliament on 1 December, Singh proposed the name of Devi Lal as Prime Minister, in spite of the fact that he himself had been clearly projected by the anti-Congress forces as the 'clean' alternative to Rajiv Gandhi and their Prime Ministerial candidate. Chaudhary Devi Lal, a Jat leader from Haryana stood up and refused the nomination, and said that he would prefer to be an 'elder uncle' to the Government, and that Singh should be Prime Minister. This last part came as a clear surprise to Chandra Shekhar, the former head of the erstwhile Janata Party, and Singh's greatest rival within the Janata Dal. Shekhar, who had clearly expected that an agreement had been forged with Lal as the consensus candidate, withdrew from the meeting and refused to serve in the Cabinet.

Singh was sworn in as India's Prime Minister on 2 December 1989.

Prime Minister (1989  1990)

Singh held office for slightly less than a year, from 2 December 1989 to 10 November 1990. After state legislative elections in March 1990, Singh's governing coalition achieved control of both houses of India's parliament. During this time, Janata Dal came to power in five Indian states under Om Prakash Chautala (Banarsi Das Gupta, Hukam Singh), Chimanbhai Patel, Biju Patnaik, Lalu Prasad Yadav, and Mulayam Singh Yadav, and the National Front constituents in two more NT Rama Rao, and Prafulla Kumar Mahanta. The Janata Dal also shared power in West Bengal under Jyoti Basu, in Kerala under EK Nayanar and in Rajasthan under Bhairon Singh Shekhawat (supporting the Bharatiya Janata Party government from outside). Singh decided to end the Indian army's unsuccessful operation in Sri Lanka which Rajiv Gandhi, his predecessor, had sent to combat the Tamil separatist movement.

In Punjab, Singh replaced the hard-line Siddhartha Shankar Ray as Governor with another former bureaucrat, Nirmal Kumar Mukarji, who moved forward on a timetable for fresh elections. Singh himself made a much-publicised visit to the Golden Temple to ask forgiveness for Operation Blue Star and the combination of events caused the long rebellion in Punjab to die down markedly in a few months.

He also thwarted the efforts of Pakistan under Benazir Bhutto to start a border war with India.

Exodus of Kasmiri Hindus 

V. P. Singh faced his first crisis within few days of taking office, when Kashmiri militants kidnapped the daughter of his Home Minister, Mufti Mohammad Sayeed (then Chief Minister of Jammu and Kashmir). His government agreed to the demand for releasing militants in exchange; partly to end the storm of criticism that followed, he shortly thereafter appointed Jagmohan Malhotra, a former bureaucrat, as Governor of Jammu and Kashmir.

The Hindus of the Kashmir Valley, were forced to flee the Kashmir valley as a result of being targeted by JKLF and Islamist insurgents during late 1989 and early 1990. Of the approximately 300,000 to 600,000 Hindus living in the Kashmir Valley in 1990 only 2,000–3,000 remain there in 2016. 19 January 1990 is widely remembered by Kashmiri Hindus as the tragic "genocide day" of being forced out of Kashmir. Before governor Jagmohan took over and the governor's rule was imposed and the army deployed in January 1990, Hindus in the valley, were killed. Of the 2,150 incidents of violence, 2100 attacks were against civilians. The Home Minister at that time Mufti Mohammad Sayeed was blamed for this act and was called it as the support of the Islamic insurgents to establish Islamic state in Jammu and Kashmir (state).

62 Amendment of 1989 and SC-ST Act 
In the year 1989, the government by Singh implemented the SC-ST Act of 1989 to prevent the atrocities against the members of Scheduled Castes and Scheduled Tribes. It was enacted when the provisions of the existing laws (such as the Protection of Civil Rights Act 1955 and Indian Penal Code) were found to be inadequate to check these crimes (defined as 'atrocities' in the Act). Recognising the continuing gross indignities and offences against Scheduled Castes and Tribes, the Parliament passed the 'Scheduled Castes and Schedule Tribes (Prevention of Atrocities) Act 1989. The objectives of the Act clearly emphasised the intention of the government to deliver justice to these communities through proactive efforts to enable them to live in society with dignity and self-esteem and without fear or violence or suppression from the dominant castes. The practice of untouchability, in its overt and covert form was made a cognizable and non-compoundable offence, and strict punishment is provided for any such offence. The act was finally passed somehow with controversies.

Mandal Commission report

Singh himself wished to move forward nationally on social justice-related issues, which would, in addition, consolidate the caste coalition that supported the Janata Dal in northern India, and accordingly decided to implement the recommendations of the Mandal Commission which suggested that a fixed quota of all jobs in the public sector be reserved for members of the historically disadvantaged called Other Backward Classes.

This decision led to widespread protests among the upper caste youth in urban areas in northern India. OBC reservation (less creamy layer) was upheld by the Supreme Court in 2008. Culturally unique features of the protests and riots were bandhs (a version of a strike), hartals (a version of a municipal shut-down), dharnas (a version of swarming). Articles also highlighted politicians and victims of rioting during the protests. Although not advisable, late summer travel by airline and vehicle during the protests was possible without delays, between capitals New Delhi and Chandigarh, and Shimla for example. Police prevented extending the range and duration of the strikes, and some strike activity from even occurring. A national state of emergency was largely not declared to mobilize army units against any one demonstration. The strike helped to give large popularity to the Mandal Commission report and fueled the political grouping of the OBC castes, which later helped a lot for the strengthening of regional political parties and stronger parties other than Congress and BJP. Due to the loss of the votes of the backward caste neither party opposed it and on seeing the protest nor parties declined it.

Even after the passing of the reservations for the Other Backward Class, he was never accepted by them and his upper-caste voters also who didn't have trust him. Afterward, OBC leaders flexed their political power and outnumbered upper and lower castes to gain political power in Uttar Pradesh, Bihar, Madhya Pradesh, and Rajasthan. The OBC leaders rejected to share power with lower caste leaders.

Tug of war with the Reliance group
In 1990, the government-owned financial institutions like the Life Insurance Corporation of India and the General Insurance Corporation of India stonewalled attempts by the Reliance group to acquire managerial control over Larsen & Toubro. Sensing defeat, the Ambanis resigned from the board of the company. Dhirubhai, who had become Larsen & Toubro's chairman in April 1989, had to quit his position to make way for D. N. Ghosh, former chairman of the State Bank of India.

Ram temple issue and the fall of the coalition

Meanwhile, the Bharatiya Janata Party was moving its own agenda forward. In particular, the Ram Janmabhoomi agitation, which served as a rallying cry for several Hindu organisations, took on a new life. The party president, LK Advani, with Pramod Mahajan as aide, toured the northern states on a rath – a bus converted to look like a mythical chariot – with the intention of drumming up support. Before he could complete the tour by reaching the disputed site in Ayodhya, he was arrested by Lalu Prasad Yadav's orders at Samastipur on the charges of disturbing the peace and fomenting communal tension. Lalu wanted to prevent the communal clashes which took place at different places for this Rath Yatra, and also Bihar faced a similar scenario in 1989 due to the Shilanyas by Rajiv Gandhi Government. Karsevaks reached the site on 30 October 1990, and by the orders of Mulayam Singh Yadav police fired openly upon the Kar sevaks. A deadly riot took place in Ayodhya on 2 November.

This led to the Bharatiya Janata Party's suspension of support to the National Front government. VP Singh faced the vote of no confidence in the Lok Sabha saying that he occupied the high moral ground, as he stood for secularism, had saved the Babri Masjid at the cost of power and had upheld the fundamental principles which were challenged during the crises. "What kind of India do you want?" he asked of his opponents in Parliament, before losing the vote 142–346; only a portion of the National Front remaining loyal to him and the Left parties supported him in the vote.

And then, Singh resigned on 7 November 1990.

The Chandra Shekhar government

Chandra Shekhar immediately seized the moment and left the Janata Dal with several of his own supporters (including Devi Lal, Janeshwar Mishra, HD Deve Gowda, Maneka Gandhi, Ashoke Kumar Sen, Subodh Kant Sahay, Om Prakash Chautala, Hukam Singh, Chimanbhai Patel, Mulayam Singh Yadav, Yashwant Sinha, VC Shukla, and Sanjay Singh) to form the Samajwadi Janata Party/Janata Dal (Socialist). Although Chandra Shekhar had a mere 64 MPs, Rajiv Gandhi the leader of the Opposition, agreed to support him on the floor of the House; so he won a confidence motion and was sworn in as Prime Minister. Eight Janata Dal MPs who voted for this motion were disqualified by the speaker Rabi Ray. His government lasted only a few months before he resigned and called for fresh elections.

Post-premiership and death
VP Singh contested the new elections but his party was relegated to the opposition chiefly due to the assassination of Rajiv Gandhi (May 1991) during the election campaign, and he later retired from active politics. He spent the next few years touring the country speaking about matters related to issues of social justice and his artistic pursuits, chiefly painting.

In 1992, Singh was the first to propose the name of the future President KR Narayanan as a (eventually successful) candidate for vice president. Later the same year in December, he led his followers to Ayodhya to oppose the Karseva proposed by LK Advani, and was arrested before he could reach the site; the Masjid was demolished by the Karsevaks a few days later. In 1996, the Congress party lost the general elections and Singh was the natural choice of the winning United Front (Singh was one of the forces behind the broad United Front coalition) for the post of Prime Minister. But he declined the offer made to him by communist veteran Jyoti Basu, Bihar strongman Lalu Prasad Yadav and almost all leaders of the Janata family.

In an interview with Shekhar Gupta in July 2005, Singh said that he had resigned from the Rajiv Gandhi cabinet due to differences that arose in the dealing of information regarding commissions taken by Indian agents in the HDW submarine deal, and not due to Bofors. In April 1987, Singh received a secret telegram from J.C.Ajmani, the Indian ambassador in West Germany. The telegram stated that Indian agents had received large commissions in the HDW deal. These commissions amounted to a staggering Rs. 32.55 crore (7% of the agreed price). Singh informed Rajiv Gandhi about this and instituted an inquiry. However, the handling of this case led to differences and Singh finally resigned from the cabinet.

Singh was diagnosed with cancer in 1998 and ceased public appearances. When his cancer went into remission in 2003, he once again became a visible figure, especially in the many groupings that had inherited the space once occupied by his Janata Dal. He relaunched the Jan Morcha in 2006 with actor-turned-politician Raj Babbar as president. After Jan Morcha drew a blank in the 2007 UP elections, Raj Babbar joined the Congress, and Singh's elder son Ajeya Singh took over the reins of the party in anticipation of the 2009 General elections. Ajeya Singh then contested as Jan Morcha candidate from Fatehpur, but lost to Rakesh Sachan of the Samajwadi Party. The Jan Morcha was renamed as the National Jan Morcha in June 2009. A month later, the Jan Morcha merged with the Indian National Congress. Singh was placed under arrest in Ghaziabad as he and his supporters were proceeding towards a hauling where prohibitory orders under Section 144 had been imposed to join the farmers agitating against the acquisition of land at Dadri by the Anil Ambani-owned Reliance Industries and demanding adequate compensation. Later, Singh and CPI General Secretary AB Bardhan were again arrested on the UP border when they were proceeding to Dadri. However, Singh and Babbar were later able to evade the police, reaching Dadri on 18 August 2006, and ploughing the land in solidarity with the farmers.

Singh died after a very long struggle with multiple myeloma and kidney failure at Apollo Hospital in Delhi on 27 November 2008, aged 77. He was cremated at Allahabad on the banks of the River Ganges on 29 November 2008, his son Ajeya Singh lighting the funeral pyre. He was cremated with full state honour.

Office held

Political Offices

Political Positions

Personal life 

Singh married Princess Sita Kumari, the daughter of the Raja of Deogarh-Madaria, Rajasthan, on 25 June 1955. It was an arranged marriage. He turned 24 on the day of the marriage, and she was 18. Kumari was a Sisodia Rajput descended from Maharana Pratap of Udaipur. The couple had two sons, Ajeya Singh (born 1957), a chartered accountant in New York City, and Abhai Singh (born 1958), a doctor at the All India Institute of Medical Sciences in New Delhi. After his death, his elder son Ajeya Singh was sworned as the 42nd Raja Bahadur of the Manda estate in 2007 and in the year 2009 after two years of Singh's death, he merged his party Jan Morcha with Indian National Congress.

Cultural legacy

Films
 Juliet Reynolds, an art critic and a close friend of Singh, made a short documentary on him, titled The Art of the Impossible (45 minutes long), and covers his political and artistic career.
 Suma Josson made another film on Singh titled One More Day to Live.
Shekhar Gupta, had interview with Singh in the year 2007, titled Walk The Talk with V. P. Singh.

Books connected

See also 

 List of Rajputs
 Ram Rath Yatra
 List of prime ministers of India
 Ministry of Defence (India)
 Ministry of External Affairs (India)
 Minister of Finance (India)
 Seema Mustafa
 Chandra Shekhar
 Janata Dal
 Devi Lal
 V. P. Singh ministry
 Manda (zamindari)
 Jan Morcha
 1989 kidnapping of Rubaiya Sayeed

References

Notes

Citations

Sources

External links 

Prime minister's office
Speech opposing the India-US nuclear deal  , Oct. 2007.

|-

|-

|-

|-

|-

1931 births
2008 deaths
20th-century prime ministers of India
India MPs 1971–1977
India MPs 1980–1984
India MPs 1984–1989
India MPs 1989–1991
India MPs 1991–1996
Chief Ministers of Uttar Pradesh
Chief ministers from Indian National Congress
Commerce and Industry Ministers of India
Deaths from cancer in India
Deaths from kidney failure
Deaths from multiple myeloma
Defence Ministers of India
Education Ministers of India
Fergusson College alumni
Finance Ministers of India
Indian Hindus
Indian political party founders
Indian socialists
Janata Dal politicians
Leaders of the Rajya Sabha
Lok Sabha members from Uttar Pradesh
Ministers for Corporate Affairs
Ministers for External Affairs of India
People from Fatehpur district
Politicians from Allahabad
Prime Ministers of India
Rajya Sabha members from Uttar Pradesh
Savitribai Phule Pune University alumni
University and college founders
University of Allahabad alumni
Uttar Pradesh MLAs 1980–1985
V. P. Singh administration
People of the Sri Lankan Civil War
Indian Peace Keeping Force